Duncan Ross may refer to:

 Duncan Ross (British Columbia politician) (1870–1916), Canadian MP for Yale-Cariboo
 Duncan Graham Ross (1891–1982), Canadian MP for Middlesex West
 Duncan Campbell Ross (1871–1961), Canadian MP for Middlesex East
 Duncan Alexander Ross (1873–1954), Ontario farmer and political figure
 Duncan C. Ross, wrestler in the 1880s
 Duncan Ross (Scottish politician), Scottish nationalist activist and academic
 Duncan Ross (actor), actor in the Santa Barbara cast